Krasimir Drandarov (born 20 March 1955) is a Bulgarian weightlifter. He competed in the men's light heavyweight event at the 1980 Summer Olympics.

References

1955 births
Living people
Bulgarian male weightlifters
Olympic weightlifters of Bulgaria
Weightlifters at the 1980 Summer Olympics
Place of birth missing (living people)